El Puente (The Bridge) is a Spanish reality television series in which a group of contestants is challenged to work together as a team in order to build a bridge.

Created and produced by Zeppelin TV (part of Endemol Shine Iberia), the first season aired on #0 from 29 May 2017 to 17 July 2017. It was filmed in the Argentinian Patagonia. The series was renewed for a second season, which was filmed in Vietnam, and all of its episodes were made available on VOD on 23 September 2018. The series was hosted by Paula Vázquez.

Format 
In the first season, a group of fifteen strangers was brought together and challenged to build a bridge to an island 300 meters away in 30 days. If they were successful, each contestant had to vote on who deserved to receive the €100,000 prize that was kept there. The person with the most votes had then to decide whether to keep it for themselves or share it among the group.

In the second season, two competing groups were introduced, among other twists. Each group consisted of seven people and had to build a bridge of 400 meters in 20 days.

Series overview

International adaptations 
The French adaptation of the show, titled The Bridge : Le Trésor de Patagonie and hosted by Stéphane Rotenberg, premiered on M6 on 3 January 2019. A British adaptation, titled The Bridge and narrated by James McAvoy, was produced by Workerbee for Channel 4 in 2020. A Brazilian adaptation was produced for HBO Max in 2021. An Australian version was commissioned for Paramount+ in 2022, with the first episode also broadcast on sister free-to-air channel Network 10.

Notes

References

External links
Official website at #0 
Zeppelin TV website 

2010s Spanish television series
2017 Spanish television series debuts
2018 Spanish television series endings
Cero (TV channel) original programming
Spanish game shows
Spanish reality television series